Alpar may refer to:

People with the surname
Csoma Alpar (born 1984), Romanian futsal player
Ignác Alpár (1855–1928), Hungarian architect
Gitta Alpár (1903–1991) Hungarian-born actress
Saffet Rıza Alpar (1903–1981), Turkish chemist and rector

Other uses
Alpár, village a.k.a. Tiszaalpár
, a Swiss airline active from 192947

See also
Alpár